This list of gastropods described in 2015 is a list of new taxa of snails and slugs of every kind that have been described (following the rules of the ICZN) during the year 2015. The list only includes taxa at the level of genus or species. For changes in taxonomy above the level of genus, see Changes in the taxonomy of gastropods since 2005.

Fossil gastropods

Marine gastropods 

Aegires acauda Ortea, Moro & Espinosa, 2015
Aegires corrugatus Ortea, Moro & Espinosa, 2015
Aegires evorae Moro & Ortea, 2015
Aegires gracilis Ortea, Moro & Espinosa, 2015
Aegires lagrifaensis Ortea, Moro & Espinosa, 2015
Anachis rechonchuda Lima & Guimarães, 2015
Anacithara biconica Barros, Santana & Lima, 2015
Anacithara pupiforme Barros, Santana & Lima, 2015
Anacithara pyrgoforme Barros, Santana & Lima, 2015
Anatoma brychia Pimenta & Geiger, 2015
Anatoma campense Pimenta & Geiger, 2015
Anatoma copiosa Pimenta & Geiger, 2015
Anatoma espiritosantense Pimenta & Geiger, 2015
Antillophos liui Zhang & Zhang, 2015
Aplysiopsis singularis Moro & Ortea, 2015
Berthella punctata Alvim & Pimenta, 2015
Berthellina ignis Alvim & Pimenta, 2015
Bouchetia wareni Houart & Héros, 2015
Bulbaeolidia oasis Caballer & Ortea, 2015
Bullina terracota Moro, Ortea & Pérez-Dionis in Moro & Ortea, 2015
Cerithiella atali Fernandes, Garofalo & Pimenta, 2015
Cerithiella candela Fernandes, Garofalo & Pimenta, 2015
Cheirodonta mizifio Fernandes & Pimenta, 2015
Chicomurex globus Houart, Moe & Chen, 2015
Chicomurex pseudosuperbus Houart, Moe & Chen, 2015
Conus hughmorrisoni Lorenz & Puillandre, 2015
Crassicantharus aureatus Fraussen & Stahlschmidt, 2015
Crassicantharus beslui Fraussen & Stahlschmidt, 2015
Crassicantharus boutetorum Fraussen & Stahlschmidt, 2015
Crassicantharus feioides Fraussen & Stahlschmidt, 2015
Crassicantharus letourneuxi Fraussen & Stahlschmidt, 2015
Crassicantharus metallicus Fraussen & Stahlschmidt, 2015
Crassicantharus magnificus Fraussen & Stahlschmidt, 2015
Crassicantharus nexus Fraussen & Stahlschmidt, 2015
Crassicantharus perlatus Fraussen & Stahlschmidt, 2015
Cyclostremiscus albachiarae Perugia, 2015
Dalliconus edpetuchi Monnier, Limpalaër, Roux & Berschauer, 2015
Dentimargo caribbaeus Espinosa & Ortea, 2015
Dentimargo kicoi Espinosa & Ortea, 2015
Dentimargo mayabequensis Espinosa & Ortea, 2015
Discodoris pliconotos Moro & Ortea, 2015
Doto africoronata Shipman & Gosliner, 2015
Doto canaricoronata Moro & Ortea, 2015
Doto greenamyeri Shipman & Gosliner, 2015
Doto tingoi Moro & Ortea, 2015
Edmundsina lazaroi Moro, Ortea & Bacallado in Moro & Ortea, 2015
Engina mirabilis Fraussen & Stahlschmidt, 2015
Eratoidea jaumei Espinosa & Ortea, 2015
Eubranchus amazighi Tamsouri, Carmona, Moukrim & Cervera, 2015
Eulimetta atlantica Souza & Pimenta, 2015
Eutriphora costai Fernandes & Pimenta, 2015
Facelina carmelae Moro & Ortea, 2015
Flexopteron akainakares Houart & Héros, 2015
Fofinha cabrerae Moro & Ortea, 2015
Gargamella blokoverdensis Moro & Ortea, 2015
Gibberula adzubae Ortea, 2015
Gibberula atwoodae Ortea, 2015
Gibberula betancourtae Ortea, 2015
Gibberula boulmerkae Ortea, 2015
Gibberula delarrochae Ortea, 2015
Gibberula goodallae Ortea, 2015
Gibberula grafae Ortea, 2015
Gibberula hendricksae Ortea, 2015
Gibberula isinbayevae Ortea, 2015
Gibberula leibovitzae Ortea, 2015
Gibberula lessingae Ortea, 2015
Gibberula martingaiteae Ortea, 2015
Gibberula navratilovae Ortea, 2015
Gibberula nussbaumae Ortea, 2015
Gibberula pignonae Ortea, 2015
Gibberula robinsonae Ortea, 2015
Gibberula rowlingae Ortea, 2015
Gibberula sassenae Ortea, 2015
Gibberula veilae Ortea, 2015
Gibberula watkinsae Ortea, 2015
Gibberula zambranoae Ortea, 2015
 Gigantopelta Chen, Linse, Roterman, Copley & Rogers, 2015
 Gigantopelta aegis Chen, Linse, Roterman, Copley & Rogers, 2015
 Gigantopelta chessoia Chen, Linse, Roterman, Copley & Rogers, 2015
Gondwanorbis fueguensis Rumi & Gutiérrez Gregoric in Rumi et al., 2015
Gondwanorbis tricarinatus Rumi & Gutiérrez Gregoric in Rumi et al., 2015
Haplocochlias arawakorum Rubio & Rolán, 2015
Haplocochlias christopheri Rubio & Rolán, 2015
Haplocochlias karukera Rubio & Rolán, 2015
Hermaea cantabra Caballer & Ortea, 2015
Hyalina angelquirosi Espinosa & Ortea, 2015
Hyalina aurorae Espinosa & Ortea, 2015
Kabeiro christianae Shipman & Gosliner, 2015
Kabeiro phasmida Shipman & Gosliner, 2015
Kabeiro rubroreticulata Shipman & Gosliner, 2015
Lyria ogasawarana Bail & Chino, 2015
Manzonia martinsi Ávila & Cordeiro in Cordeiro & Avila, 2015
Mitromorpha alyssae Amati, Smriglio & Oliverio, 2015
Mitromorpha bogii Amati, Smriglio & Oliverio, 2015
Mitromorpha cossyrae Amati, Smriglio & Oliverio, 2015
Mitromorpha mariottinii Amati, Smriglio & Oliverio, 2015
Mitromorpha mifsudi Amati, Smriglio & Oliverio, 2015
Mitromorpha nofronii Amati, Smriglio & Oliverio, 2015
Mitromorpha tricolorata Amati, Smriglio & Oliverio, 2015
Murexsul mananteninaensis Houart & Héros, 2015
Nanaphora leei Fernandes & Pimenta, 2015
Naquetia rhondae Houart & Lorenz, 2015
Nassaria vermeiji Fraussen & Stahlschmidt, 2015
Notodoris lanzarotensis Moro & Ortea, 2015
Notovoluta kalotinae Bail & Limpus, 2015
Panderevela dacilae Moro & Ortea, 2015
Panderevela ipse Ortea, Moro & Espinosa in Moro & Ortea, 2015
Parviturbo annejoffeae Rubio, Rolán & Lee in Rubio, Rolán & Fernández-Garcés, 2015
Parviturbo azoricus Rubio, Rolán & Segers in Rubio, Rolán & Fernández-Garcés, 2015
Parviturbo billfranki Rubio, Rolán & Lee in Rubio, Rolán & Fernández-Garcés, 2015
Parviturbo boucheti Rubio, Rolán & Fernández-Garcés, 2015
Parviturbo brasiliensis Rubio, Rolán & Lee in Rubio, Rolán & Fernández-Garcés, 2015
Parviturbo dispar Rubio, Rolán & Letourneux in Rubio, Rolán & Fernández-Garcés, 2015
Parviturbo ergasticus Rubio, Rolán & Gofas in Rubio, Rolán & Fernández-Garcés, 2015
Parviturbo fortius Rubio, Rolán & Fernández-Garcés, 2015
Parviturbo guadeloupensis Rubio, Rolán & Fernández-Garcés, 2015
Parviturbo gofasi Rubio, Rolán & Fernández-Garcés, 2015
Parviturbo javiercondei Rubio, Rolán & Fernández-Garcés, 2015
Parviturbo marcosi Rubio, Rolán & Fernández-Garcés, 2015
Parviturbo multispiralis Rubio, Rolán & Fernández-Garcés, 2015
Parviturbo pombali Rubio, Rolán & Fernández-Garcés, 2015
Parviturbo rectangularis Rubio, Rolán & Fernández-Garcés, 2015
Parviturbo robustior Rubio, Rolán & Lee in Rubio, Rolán & Fernández-Garcés, 2015
Parviturbo seamountensis Rubio, Rolán & Gofas in Rubio, Rolán & Fernández-Garcés, 2015
Parviturbo vanuatuensis Rubio, Rolán & Fernández-Garcés, 2015
Parviturbo zylmanae Rubio, Rolán & Lee in Rubio, Rolán & Fernández-Garcés, 2015
Patagonorbis nahuelhuapensis Rumi & Gutiérrez Gregoric in Rumi et al., 2015
Perotrochus pseudogranulosus Anseeuw, Puillandre, Utge & Bouchet, 2015
Perotrochus wareni Anseeuw, Puillandre, Utge & Bouchet, 2015
Profundiconus smirnoides Tenorio, 2015
Prunum arangoi Espinosa & Ortea, 2015
Prunum egmontensis Espinosa & Ortea, 2015
Prunum ianusi Espinosa & Ortea, 2015
Prunum hunabi Espinosa & Ortea, 2015
Prunum poeyi Espinosa & Ortea, 2015
Pugilina tupiniquim Abbate & Simone, 2015
Runcinella condio Moro & Ortea, 2015
Setia alexandrae Ávila & Cordeiro in Cordeiro & Avila, 2015
Setia ermelindoi Ávila & Cordeiro in Cordeiro & Avila, 2015
Setia homerica Romani & Scuderi, 2015
Setia netoae Ávila & Cordeiro in Cordeiro & Avila, 2015
Simnia jacintoi Fehse & Trigo, 2015
Siphonochelus aethomorpha Houart & Héros, 2015
Tambja mediterranea Domínguez, Pola & Ramón, 2015
Taringa arcaica Moro & Ortea, 2015
Taringa robledales Ortea, Moro & Espinosa in Moro & Ortea, 2015
Tenorioconus monicae Petuch & Berschauer, 2015
Tenorioconus rosi Petuch & Berschauer, 2015
Thala kawabei Herrmann & Chino, 2015
Timbellus goniodes Houart & Héros, 2015
Timbellus pannuceus Houart & Héros, 2015
Trapania bajamarensis Moro & Ortea, 2015
Triphora charybdis Fernandes & Pimenta, 2015
Triphora scylla Fernandes & Pimenta, 2015
Trituba anubis Fernandes, Garofalo & Pimenta, 2015
Trophonopsis sparacioi Smriglio, Mariottini & Di Giulio, 2015
Turbo lorenzi Alf & Kreipl, 2015
Typhinellus constrictus Houart & Héros, 2015
Typhinellus jacolombi Houart, 2015
Typhinellus laminatus Houart & Héros, 2015
Vexillum croceostoma Marrow, 2015
Vokesimurex aliquantulus Houart & Héros, 2015
Volvarina abdieli Espinosa, Ortea & Diez, 2015
Volvarina aethrae Espinosa & Ortea, 2015
Volvarina aglae Espinosa & Ortea, 2015
Volvarina alayoi Espinosa, Ortea & Diez, 2015
Volvarina alayoni Espinosa & Ortea, 2015
Volvarina amphitrite Espinosa & Ortea, 2015
Volvarina anamariae Espinosa & Ortea, 2015
Volvarina ariadnae Espinosa & Ortea, 2015
Volvarina bellamatancera Espinosa & Ortea, 2015
Volvarina bernardoi Espinosa, Ortea & Diez, 2015
Volvarina borinquensis Espinosa & Ortea, 2015
Volvarina calliopeae Espinosa & Ortea, 2015
Volvarina callypsoe Espinosa & Ortea, 2015
Volvarina caprina Espinosa & Ortea, 2015
Volvarina casiguaya Espinosa, Ortea & Díez in Espinosa & Ortea, 2015
Volvarina cienfueguera Espinosa, Ortea & Diez, 2015
Volvarina cubana Espinosa & Ortea, 2015
Volvarina cybelesae Espinosa & Ortea, 2015
Volvarina davidi Espinosa, Ortea & Diez, 2015
Volvarina dennisi Espinosa, Ortea & Diez, 2015
Volvarina dorisae Espinosa & Ortea, 2015
Volvarina fifi Espinosa & Ortea, 2015
Volvarina gemma Espinosa & Ortea, 2015
Volvarina guamaense Espinosa, Ortea & Diez, 2015
Volvarina hemingwayi Espinosa & Ortea, 2015
Volvarina holguinera Espinosa, Ortea & Diez, 2015
Volvarina humboldtiana Espinosa, Ortea & Diez, 2015
Volvarina ireneae Espinosa & Ortea, 2015
Volvarina irisae Espinosa & Ortea, 2015
Volvarina ixchelae Espinosa & Ortea, 2015
Volvarina juancarlosi Espinosa, Ortea & Diez, 2015
Volvarina juraguaense Espinosa, Ortea & Diez, 2015
Volvarina larramendii Espinosa, Ortea & Diez, 2015
Volvarina lilianamariae Espinosa, Ortea & Diez, 2015
Volvarina nautica Espinosa & Ortea, 2015
Volvarina nicasioi Espinosa, Ortea & Diez, 2015
Volvarina pallasae Espinosa & Ortea, 2015
Volvarina pandorae Espinosa & Ortea, 2015
Volvarina pedroelcojo Espinosa, Ortea & Diez, 2015
Volvarina penelope Espinosa & Ortea, 2015
Volvarina phorcusi Espinosa & Ortea, 2015
Volvarina rancholunense Espinosa, Ortea & Diez, 2015
Volvarina santiagocubense Espinosa, Ortea & Diez, 2015
Volvarina thaliae Espinosa & Ortea, 2015
Volvarina tobyi Espinosa, Ortea & Diez, 2015
Volvarina toroensis Espinosa & Ortea, 2015
Volvarina xamaneki Espinosa & Ortea, 2015
Volvarina yunkaxi Espinosa & Ortea, 2015
Other taxa
 genus Fofinha Moro & Ortea, 2015
 genus Jenseneria Moro & Ortea, 2015
 genus Panderevela Moro & Ortea, 2015

Freshwater gastropods 
Belgrandiella delevae Georgiev & Glöer, 2015
Belgrandiella lomica Georgiev & Glöer, 2015
Bracenica vitojaensis Glöer, Grego, Erőss & Fehér, 2015
Bythinella anatolica Yıldırım, Kebapçı & Bahadır Koca in Yıldırım, Kebapçı, Bahadır Koca & Yüce, 2015
Bythinella golemoensis Glöer & Mrkvicka, 2015
Bythinella gregoi Glöer & Erőss, 2015
Bythinella istanbulensis Yıldırım, Kebapçı & Yüce in Yıldırım, Kebapçı, Bahadır Koca & Yüce, 2015
Bythinella magdalenae Yıldırım, Kebapçı & Bahadır Koca in Yıldırım, Kebapçı, Bahadır Koca & Yüce, 2015
Bythinella melovskii Glöer & Slavevska-Stamenković, 2015
Bythinella muranyii Glöer & Erőss, 2015
Bythinella thermophila Glöer, Varga & Mrkvicka, 2015
Bythinella wilkei Yıldırım, Kebapçı & Bahadır Koca in Yıldırım, Kebapçı, Bahadır Koca & Yüce, 2015
Bythinia shapkarevi Glöer, Shoreva & Slavevska-Stamenković, 2015
Bythiospeum blihensis Glöer & Grego, 2015
Bythiospeum iltchoi Georgiev & Glöer, 2015
Bythiospeum iltchokolevi Georgiev & Glöer, 2015
Bythiospeum juliae Georgiev & Glöer, 2015
Bythiospeum hrustovoensis Glöer & Grego, 2015
Bythiospeum maroskoi Glöer & Grego, 2015
Bythiospeum petroedei Glöer & Grego, 2015
Bythiospeum plivensis Glöer & Grego, 2015
Bythiospeum szarowskae Glöer, Grego, Erőss & Fehér, 2015
Caspia milae Boeters, Glöer, Georgiev & Dedov, 2015
Daphniola magdalenae Falniowski in Falnowski & Sarbu, 2015
Devetakia veselinae Georgiev & Glöer, 2015
Ferrissia fivefallsiensis Sankarappan, Chellapandian, Vimalanathan, Mani, Sundaram & Muthukalingan, 2015
Graecoanatolica nageli Glöer & Pešić, 2015
Graecoanatolica yildirimi Glöer & Pešić, 2015
Grossuana falniowskii Georgiev, Glöer, Dedov & Irikov, 2015
Heleobia deserticola Collado, 2015
Hemistomia andreae Haase & Zielske, 2015
Iglica hellenica Falnowski & Sarbu, 2015
Islamia montenegrina Glöer, Grego, Erőss & Fehér, 2015
Islamia steffeki Glöer & Grego, 2015
Lanzaia pesici Glöer, Grego, Erőss & Fehér, 2015
Mercuria bakeri Glöer, Boeters & Walther, 2015
Mercuria rolani Glöer, Boeters & Walther, 2015
Mercuria targuasensis Glöer, Boeters & Walther, 2015
Mercuria tingitana Glöer, Boeters & Walther, 2015
Microstygia deltchevi Georgiev & Glöer, 2015
Moitessieria tatirocae Tarruella, Corbella, Prats, Guillén & Alba, 2015
Kolevia bulgarica Georgiev & Glöer, 2015
Leiorhagium adioincola Haase & Zielske, 2015
Leiorhagium aremuum Haase & Zielske, 2015
Leiorhagium clandestinum Haase & Zielske, 2015
Leiorhagium neteae Haase & Zielske, 2015
Planorbis cretensis Glöer & Hirschfelder, 2015
Pseudamnicola collingi Boeters, Callot-Girardi & Knebelsberger, 2015
Pseudamnicola krumensis Glöer, Grego, Erőss & Fehér, 2015
Pseudamnicola moussonii magozensis Glöer & Boeters, 2015
Pseudamnicola tajoensis Boeters, Callot-Girardi & Knebelsberger, 2015
Pseudamnicola tejedoi Boeters, Callot-Girardi & Knebelsberger, 2015
Pseudamnicola valladolensis kahbei Boeters, Callot-Girardi & Knebelsberger, 2015
Pseudamnicola valladolensis valladolensis Boeters, Callot-Girardi & Knebelsberger, 2015
Sumia macedonica Glöer & Mrkvicka, 2015
Tchangmargarya multilabiata Zhang & Chen in Zhang, Chen, Yang, Jin & Köhler, 2015
Theodoxus gloeri Odabaşi & Arslan, 2015
Tryonia infernalis Hershler, Liu & Simpson, 2015
Valvata kebapcii Odabaşi, Glöer & Yıldırım, 2015

Land gastropods 

Acmella cyrtoglyphe Vermeulen, Liew, & Schilthuizen, 2015
Acmella nana Vermeulen, Liew, & Schilthuizen, 2015
Acmella ovoidea Vermeulen, Liew, & Schilthuizen, 2015
Acmella striata Vermeulen, Liew, & Schilthuizen, 2015
Acmella subcancellata Vermeulen, Liew, & Schilthuizen, 2015
Acmella umbilicata Vermeulen, Liew, & Schilthuizen, 2015
Aegista hiroshifukudai Hirano, Kameda & Chiba, 2015
Albinaria almae efthimia Nordsieck, 2015
Albinaria arcadica occulta Nordsieck, 2015
Albinaria beckmanni Nordsieck, 2015
Albinaria brevicollis maltezana Nordsieck, 2015
Albinaria buresi aoos Nordsieck, 2015
Albinaria butoti kwanti Nordsieck, 2015
Albinaria confusa principallifera Nordsieck, 2015
Albinaria delvinensis Nordsieck, 2015
Albinaria haussknechti mouzakiensis Nordsieck, 2015
Albinaria nivea grossa Nordsieck, 2015
Albinaria nivea reuselaarsi Nordsieck, 2015
Albinaria schuetti miraptyx Nordsieck, 2015
Albinaria schuetti serresensis Nordsieck, 2015
Albinaria scopulosa acutispira Nordsieck, 2015
Albinaria scopulosa echinarum Nordsieck, 2015
Amphidromus globonevilli Sutcharit & Panha, 2015
Amphidromus principalis Sutcharit & Panha, 2015
Amphidromus psephos Vermeulen, Liew, & Schilthuizen, 2015
Anaglyphula sauroderma Vermeulen, Liew, & Schilthuizen, 2015
Angustopila dominikae Páll-Gergely & Hunyadi in Páll-Gergely, Hunyadi, Jochum & Asami, 2015
Angustopila fabella Páll-Gergely & Hunyadi in Páll-Gergely, Hunyadi, Jochum & Asami, 2015
Angustopila subelevata Páll-Gergely & Hunyadi in Páll-Gergely, Hunyadi, Jochum & Asami, 2015
Angustopila szekeresi Páll-Gergely & Hunyadi in Páll-Gergely, Hunyadi, Jochum & Asami, 2015
Boucardicus monchenkoi Balashov & Griffiths, 2015
Boucardicus ambindaensis Balashov & Griffiths, 2015
Boysidia jingpingensis Tian, Fang & Chen, 2015
Boysidia qingliangfengensis Fang, Wang & Chen, 2015
Bulgarica hemmenorum Nordsieck, 2015
Chondrina feneriensis Bodon, Nardi, Cianfanelli & Kokshoorn, 2015
Curvella hatrotes Vermeulen, Liew, & Schilthuizen, 2015
Delima binotata grahovensis Nordsieck, 2015
Delima montenegrina tarensis Nordsieck, 2015
Diancta aurea Neubert & Bouchet, 2015
Diancta aurita Neubert & Bouchet, 2015
Diancta basiplana Neubert & Bouchet, 2015
Diancta controversa Neubert & Bouchet, 2015
Diancta densecostulata Neubert & Bouchet, 2015
Diancta dextra Neubert & Bouchet, 2015
Diancta dilatata Neubert & Bouchet, 2015
Diancta distorta Neubert & Bouchet, 2015
Diancta pulchella Neubert & Bouchet, 2015
Diancta rotunda Neubert & Bouchet, 2015
Diancta subquadrata Neubert & Bouchet, 2015
Diancta trilamellata Neubert & Bouchet, 2015
Diplommatina bidentata Vermeulen, Liew, & Schilthuizen, 2015
Diplommatina nakashimai Minato, 2015
Diplommatina tylocheilos Vermeulen, Liew, & Schilthuizen, 2015
Ditropopsis cincta Vermeulen, Liew, & Schilthuizen, 2015
Ditropopsis constricta Vermeulen, Liew, & Schilthuizen, 2015
Ditropopsis davisoni Vermeulen, Liew, & Schilthuizen, 2015
Ditropopsis trachychilus Vermeulen, Liew, & Schilthuizen, 2015
Ditropopsis tyloacron Vermeulen, Liew, & Schilthuizen, 2015
Drymaeus dakryodes Salvador, Cavallari & Simone, 2015
'Durgella' densestriata Vermeulen, Liew, & Schilthuizen, 2015
Dyakia chlorosoma Vermeulen, Liew, & Schilthuizen, 2015
Endothyrella angulata Budha & Páll-Gergely in Páll-Gergely, Budha, Naggs, Backeljau & Asami, 2015
Endothyrella dolakhaensis Budha & Páll-Gergely in Páll-Gergely, Budha, Naggs, Backeljau & Asami, 2015
Endothyrella inexpectata Páll-Gergely in Páll-Gergely, Budha, Naggs, Backeljau & Asami, 2015
Endothyrella nepalica Budha & Páll-Gergely in Páll-Gergely, Budha, Naggs, Backeljau & Asami, 2015
Endothyrella robustistriata Páll-Gergely in Páll-Gergely, Budha, Naggs, Backeljau & Asami, 2015
Eostrobilops humicolus Páll-Gergely & Hunyadi in Páll-Gergely, Hunyadi & Asami, 2015
Garnieria mouhoti nhuongi Do & Do, 2015
Georissa leucococca Vermeulen, Liew, & Schilthuizen, 2015
Georissa nephrostoma Vermeulen, Liew, & Schilthuizen, 2015
Geotrochus kitteli Vermeulen, Liew, & Schilthuizen, 2015
Geotrochus meristotrochus Vermeulen, Liew, & Schilthuizen, 2015
Geotrochus oedobasis Vermeulen, Liew, & Schilthuizen, 2015
Geotrochus scolops Vermeulen, Liew, & Schilthuizen, 2015
Geotrochus spilokeiria Vermeulen, Liew, & Schilthuizen, 2015
Geotrochus subscalaris Vermeulen, Liew, & Schilthuizen, 2015
Gudeodiscus hemmeni Páll-Gergely & Hunyadi in Páll-Gergely, Hunyadi, Ablett, Lương, Naggs & Asami, 2015
Gudeodiscus messageri raheemi Páll-Gergely & Hunyadi in Páll-Gergely, Hunyadi, Ablett, Lương, Naggs & Asami, 2015
Helicostyla amagaensis de Chavez in de Chavez, Fontanilla, Batomalaque & Chiba, 2015
Hungerfordia aspera Yamazaki & Ueshima in Yamazaki, Yamazaki, Rundell & Ueshima, 2015
Hungerfordia angaurensis Yamazaki & Ueshima in Yamazaki, Yamazaki, & Ueshima, 2015
Hungerfordia basodonta Yamazaki & Ueshima in Yamazaki, Yamazaki, & Ueshima, 2015
Hungerfordia brachyptera Yamazaki & Ueshima in Yamazaki, Yamazaki, & Ueshima, 2015
Hungerfordia chilorhytis Yamazaki & Ueshima in Yamazaki, Yamazaki, Rundell & Ueshima, 2015
Hungerfordia crassilabris attenuata Yamazaki & Ueshima in Yamazaki, Yamazaki, & Ueshima, 2015
Hungerfordia crassilabris tridentata Yamazaki & Ueshima in Yamazaki, Yamazaki, & Ueshima, 2015
Hungerfordia crenata Yamazaki & Ueshima in Yamazaki, Yamazaki, & Ueshima, 2015
Hungerfordia elegantissima anomphala Yamazaki & Ueshima in Yamazaki, Yamazaki, Rundell & Ueshima, 2015
Hungerfordia eurystoma Yamazaki & Ueshima in Yamazaki, Yamazaki, & Ueshima, 2015
Hungerfordia fragilipennis Yamazaki & Ueshima in Yamazaki, Yamazaki, Rundell & Ueshima, 2015
Hungerfordia globosa Yamazaki & Ueshima in Yamazaki, Yamazaki, Rundell & Ueshima, 2015
Hungerfordia goniobasis exserta Yamazaki & Ueshima in Yamazaki, Yamazaki, Rundell & Ueshima, 2015
Hungerfordia irregularis Yamazaki & Ueshima in Yamazaki, Yamazaki, Rundell & Ueshima, 2015
Hungerfordia longissima Yamazaki & Ueshima in Yamazaki, Yamazaki, & Ueshima, 2015
Hungerfordia lutea hemilaevis Yamazaki & Ueshima in Yamazaki, Yamazaki, & Ueshima, 2015
Hungerfordia loxodonta Yamazaki & Ueshima in Yamazaki, Yamazaki, & Ueshima, 2015
Hungerfordia microbasodonta Yamazaki & Ueshima in Yamazaki, Yamazaki, & Ueshima, 2015
Hungerfordia ngereamensis Yamazaki & Ueshima in Yamazaki, Yamazaki, Rundell & Ueshima, 2015
Hungerfordia nodulosa Yamazaki & Ueshima in Yamazaki, Yamazaki, Rundell & Ueshima, 2015
Hungerfordia omphaloptyx Yamazaki & Ueshima in Yamazaki, Yamazaki, & Ueshima, 2015
Hungerfordia pyramis pteroma Yamazaki & Ueshima in Yamazaki, Yamazaki, & Ueshima, 2015
Hungerfordia ringens rotundatus Yamazaki & Ueshima in Yamazaki, Yamazaki, & Ueshima, 2015
Hungerfordia ringens ventrinodus Yamazaki & Ueshima in Yamazaki, Yamazaki, & Ueshima, 2015
Hungerfordia robiginosa Yamazaki & Ueshima in Yamazaki, Yamazaki, & Ueshima, 2015
Hungerfordia rudicostata Yamazaki & Ueshima in Yamazaki, Yamazaki, & Ueshima, 2015
Hungerfordia spinoscapula Yamazaki & Ueshima in Yamazaki, Yamazaki, & Ueshima, 2015
Hungerfordia spiroperculata Yamazaki & Ueshima in Yamazaki, Yamazaki, Rundell & Ueshima, 2015
Hungerfordia unisulcata Yamazaki & Ueshima in Yamazaki, Yamazaki, & Ueshima, 2015
Hypselostoma lacrima Páll-Gergely & Hunyadi in Páll-Gergely, Hunyadi, Jochum & Asami, 2015
Hypselostoma socialis Páll-Gergely & Hunyadi in Páll-Gergely, Hunyadi, Jochum & Asami, 2015
Japonia anceps Vermeulen, Liew, & Schilthuizen, 2015
Kaliella eurytrochus Vermeulen, Liew, & Schilthuizen, 2015
Kaliella microsoma Vermeulen, Liew, & Schilthuizen, 2015
Kaliella phacomorpha Vermeulen, Liew, & Schilthuizen, 2015
Kaliella punctata Vermeulen, Liew, & Schilthuizen, 2015
Kaliella sublaxa Vermeulen, Liew, & Schilthuizen, 2015
Kenyirus sheema Foon, Tan & Clements, 2015
Kora nigra Simone, 2015
Kora iracema Simone, 2015
Kora terrea Simone, 2015
Koreozospeum nodongense Lee, Prozorova & Jochum in Jochum, Prozorova, Sharyi-ool & Páll-Gergely, 2015
Krobylos sinensis Páll-Gergely & Hunyadi in Páll-Gergely, Hunyadi, Jochum & Asami, 2015
Leiostyla beatae Walther & Hausdorf, 2015
Lilloiconcha lopezi Araya & Aliaga, 2015
Microcystina callifera Vermeulen, Liew, & Schilthuizen, 2015
Microcystina microrhynchus Vermeulen, Liew, & Schilthuizen, 2015
Microcystina physotrochus Vermeulen, Liew, & Schilthuizen, 2015
Microcystina planiuscula Vermeulen, Liew, & Schilthuizen, 2015
Microcystina striatula Vermeulen, Liew, & Schilthuizen, 2015
Moussonia acuta Neubert & Bouchet, 2015
Moussonia barkeri Neubert & Bouchet, 2015
Moussonia brodieae Neubert & Bouchet, 2015
Moussonia longipalatalis Neubert & Bouchet, 2015
Moussonia minutissima Neubert & Bouchet, 2015
Moussonia obesa Neubert & Bouchet, 2015
Moussonia polita Neubert & Bouchet, 2015
Moussonia uncinata Neubert & Bouchet, 2015
Moussonia vitianoides Neubert & Bouchet, 2015
Palaina alberti Neubert & Bouchet, 2015
Palaina flammulata Neubert & Bouchet, 2015
Palaina glabella Neubert & Bouchet, 2015
Palaina kitteli Neubert & Bouchet, 2015
Palaina labeosa Neubert & Bouchet, 2015
Palaina parietalis Neubert & Bouchet, 2015
Palaina sulcata Neubert & Bouchet, 2015
Palaina truncata Neubert & Bouchet, 2015
Palaina tuberosissima Neubert & Bouchet, 2015
Pallidelix simonhudsoni Stanisic, 2015
Paralaoma angusta Vermeulen, Liew, & Schilthuizen, 2015
Pearsonia lamphunensis Tumpeesuwan & Tumpeesuwan, 2015
Philalanka anomphala Vermeulen, Liew, & Schilthuizen, 2015
Philalanka malimgunung Vermeulen, Liew, & Schilthuizen, 2015
Philalanka obscura Vermeulen, Liew, & Schilthuizen, 2015
Philalanka rugulosa Vermeulen, Liew, & Schilthuizen, 2015
Philalanka tambunanensis Vermeulen, Liew, & Schilthuizen, 2015
Plectorhagada teres Taylor, Johnson & Stankowski, 2015
Plekocheilus cecepeus Breure & Araujo, 2015
Pseudopomatias abletti Páll-Gergely in Páll-Gergely, Fehér, Hunyadi & Asami, 2015
Pseudopomatias harli Páll-Gergely in Páll-Gergely, Fehér, Hunyadi & Asami, 2015
Pseudopomatias lianprietoae Páll-Gergely in Páll-Gergely, Fehér, Hunyadi & Asami, 2015
Pseudopomatias maasseni Páll-Gergely & Hunyadi in Páll-Gergely, Fehér, Hunyadi & Asami, 2015
Pseudopomatias nitens Páll-Gergely in Páll-Gergely, Fehér, Hunyadi & Asami, 2015
Pseudopomatias prestoni Páll-Gergely in Páll-Gergely, Fehér, Hunyadi & Asami, 2015
Pseudopomatias reischuetzi Páll-Gergely in Páll-Gergely, Fehér, Hunyadi & Asami, 2015
Pseudopomatias shanensis Páll-Gergely in Páll-Gergely, Fehér, Hunyadi & Asami, 2015
Pseudopomatias sophiae Páll-Gergely in Páll-Gergely, Fehér, Hunyadi & Asami, 2015
Rahula delopleura Vermeulen, Liew, & Schilthuizen, 2015
Rhagada karajarri Burghardt & Köhler, 2015
Rhagada worora Burghardt & Köhler, 2015
Satsuma akiratadai Kameda & Fukuda, 2015
Setocallosa pathutchingsae Criscione & Köhler, 2015
Siciliaria pantocratoris epapillata Nordsieck, 2015
Siciliaria pantocratoris loutrana Nordsieck, 2015
Sinuennea copiaensis Do & Do, 2015
Sinuennea loeiensis Tanmuangpak & Tumpeesuwan in Tanmuangpak, Dumrongrojwattana, Tumpeesuwan & Tumpeesuwan, 2015
Sinuennea menglungensis Wang, Chen, Zhou & Hwang, 2015
Solaropsis alcobacensis Salvador & Simone, 2015
Stemmatopsis nangphaiensis Do & Do, 2015
Stemmatopsis vanhoensis Do & Do, 2015
Streptisaurus manduensis Taylor, Johnson & Stankowski, 2015
Streptisaurus susieae Taylor, Johnson & Stankowski, 2015
Strigilodelima conspersa subaii Nordsieck, 2015
Taiwanassiminea phantasma Hallan & Fukuda, 2015
Trachia serpentinitica Vermeulen, Liew, & Schilthuizen, 2015
Triodopsis juxtidens robinae Hotopp, 2015
Trochomorpha haptoderma Vermeulen, Liew, & Schilthuizen, 2015
Trochomorpha thelecoryphe Vermeulen, Liew, & Schilthuizen, 2015
Trochomorpha trachus Vermeulen, Liew, & Schilthuizen, 2015
Vargapupa biheli Páll-Gergely in Páll-Gergely, Fehér, Hunyadi & Asami, 2015
Vargapupa oharai Páll-Gergely in Páll-Gergely, Fehér, Hunyadi & Asami, 2015
Vitrea politissima Páll-Gergely in Páll-Gergely & Asami, 2015
Zospeum vasconicum Prieto, De Winter, Weigand, Gómez & Jochum in Jochum, De Winter, Weigand, Gómez & Prieto, 2015
Zospeum zaldivarae Prieto, De Winter, Weigand, Gómez & Jochum in Jochum, De Winter, Weigand, Gómez & Prieto, 2015

See also 
 List of gastropods described in 2014
 List of gastropods described in 2016

References 

Gastropods